Nowata (Lenape:) is a city and county seat of Nowata County, Oklahoma, United States. The population was 3,731 at the United States Census, 2010, a 6.0 percent decline from the figure of 3,971 recorded in 2000. The area where it was established was then part of the Cherokee Nation in Indian Territory.

History
The first community established at this site was named Metz, named for its first postmaster, Fred Metzner. The name was changed even before the railroad was built in 1889.
Nowata served as a train stop for Native Americans from the East being forced to resettle by the United States government. Some controversy exists about the meaning of the town name. The Lenape tribesmen who passed through named it "nuwita," meaning "friendly" or "welcome." In the Cherokee language, the town is called ᎠᎹᏗᎧᏂᎬᎬ (A-ma-di-ka-ni-gunh-gunh, roughly), which means, "water is all gone," translating what it sounded like the word meant: No Water.

In 1889, the Kansas and Arkansas Valley Railway (later part of the Missouri Pacific Railway) built a line through Nowata. A post office was established in the town on November 8, 1889. Nowata was incorporated April 17, 1899. By 1900, Nowata had 498 residents.

Oil and gas were discovered nearby in 1904, stimulating the Nowata economy. The find established Nowata as "...a region (having)  a reputation for being the world's largest shallow oil field."  Some wells in this field have continued to produce into the twenty-first century.

A Federal court was established in 1904, and met on the third floor of the new building owned by the First National Bank of Nowata. The building housing the court burned down in 1909, destroying all records and forcing the court to move temporarily to another building.  When Oklahoma became a state on November 16, 1907, Nowata County was created and named for the city, which was designated as the county seat. By that time, the city population had climbed to 2,233. A permanent Nowata County Courthouse was completed in 1912, and remains in use at present. It is the only local property listed on the National Record of Historic Places.

On September 29, 1916, two men, accused of killing a deputy sheriff, were taken from the Nowata jail by a mob and lynched in front of the courthouse.

Nowata's peak population was 4,435 in 1920. It became the southern terminus of the Union Electric Railway, which continued to serve the city until 1948. Newspapers included the Nowata Herald and the Nowata Advertiser. The town had 850 telephones by 1930, when the census showed its first population decline, to nearly the 1910 level.

Geography
Yet the Virdigris River runs through it.

Climate
Nowata is the home of the coldest temperature ever recorded in the state of Oklahoma.

Demographics

As of the census of 2000, there were 3,971 people, 1,622 households, and 1,026 families residing in the city. The population density was 1,280.5 people per square mile (494.6/km). There were 1,853 housing units at an average density of 597.5 per square mile (230.8/km). The racial makeup of the city was 70.08% White, 4.66% African American, 16.02% Native American, 0.13% Asian, 0.38% from other races, and 8.74% from two or more races. Hispanic or Latino of any race were 1.18% of the population.

There were 1,622 households, out of which 28.7% had children under the age of 18 living with them, 46.5% were married couples living together, 13.4% had a female householder with no husband present, and 36.7% were non-families. 33.8% of all households were made up of individuals, and 19.2% had someone living alone who was 65 years of age or older. The average household size was 2.32 and the average family size was 2.96.

In the city, the population was spread out, with 25.6% under the age of 18, 8.2% from 18 to 24, 22.9% from 25 to 44, 21.6% from 45 to 64, and 21.7% who were 65 years of age or older. The median age was 40 years. For every 100 females, there were 90.3 males. For every 100 females age 18 and over, there were 84.7 males.

The median income for a household in the city was $23,835, and the median income for a family was $31,836. Males had a median income of $26,556 versus $18,989 for females. The per capita income for the city was $12,633. About 11.6% of families and 19.2% of the population were below the poverty line, including 24.0% of those under age 18 and 11.5% of those age 65 or over.

Economy
At the beginning of the 21st Century, Nowata had 130 different businesses. The most notable was the forty-bed Jane Phillips Nowata Health Center. The weekly Nowata Star newspaper kept readers informed about local events and issues.

Government
The city has a council-manager form of government.

Transportation
Nowata is served by two U.S. highways, one airport, and one Class 1 railroad

Highways
US-169 is the main north–south U.S. Highway for both the city of Nowata and Nowata County. The highway runs along Ash Street from just north of the Nowata Municipal Airport from nearby Lenapah, to where it exits the city to the south over the Union Pacific viaduct east of Memorial Park Cemetery. The highway continues south toward Tulsa, Oklahoma.
US-60 is the main east–west U.S. Highway for both Nowata and Nowata County. US-60 follows Vinita Road on the east side of the city of Nowata. The highway turns to the northwest at the intersection of Vinita Road/Gerlach Street/East Fairview Avenue, then turns west on Cherokee Avenue at South Hill Street. The highway remains on Cherokee Avenue, crosses US-169 at Ash Street to Pine Street where it turns to the north. The highway runs north on Pine Street for one city block to West Delaware. The highway then follows West Delaware Avenue, where it will continue west for one city block then turn north on North Pecan Street. The highway then runs along North Pecan Street for one city block where it turns west onto W. Davis Drive. The highway follows West Davis Drive, turns northwest at Mississippi Street, continues on West Davis Drive, then exits the city northwest of Turner Lane, continuing west toward the city of Bartlesville

Airport

Nowata Municipal Airport is located on the north side of the city on US-169. Nowata Municipal Airport is owned by the City of Nowata.

Railroad

Nowata Oklahoma is served by the Union Pacific Railroad. The Wagoner Subdivision begins to the north in the nearby city of Coffeyville Kansas and runs roughly parallel with US-169 through Nowata County. The subdivision runs through the towns of South Coffeyville, Lenapah, Delaware, Nowata, and Watova. The Union Pacific Wagoner Subdivision and the Burlington Northern & Santa Fe Cherokee Subdivision has its diamond in the nearby city of Claremore Oklahoma. The south end of the Wagoner Subdivision is located in the city of Van Buren Arkansas.

Filmography
Nowata was the setting for the 1998 movie Possums. In the movie, a man played by Mac Davis tries to bring back the town's cancelled high school football program. Scenes were filmed in town and guest starred Barry Switzer and many locals.

Notable people
Kurt Burris, football player
Flora Campbell, actress and star of the first network TV soap opera, Faraway Hill
Julian Wood Glass Jr., businessman and philanthropist
Lulu M. Hefner, first woman to drill a producing oil well
Ray Starr, baseball player

See also

 National Register of Historic Places listings in Nowata County, Oklahoma

References

External links

 Nowata Public Schools

Cities in Oklahoma
Cities in Nowata County, Oklahoma
County seats in Oklahoma
Tulsa metropolitan area
Populated places established in 1889
1889 establishments in Indian Territory